The NhaD family (TC# 2.A.62) belongs to the Ion Transporter (IT) Superfamily. A representative list of proteins belonging to the NhaD family can be found in the Transporter Classification Database.

The NhaD Na+/H+ antiporter has been characterized from two Vibrio species: V. parahaemolyticus and V. cholerae and in the haloalkaliphile, Alkalimonas amylolytica. These proteins and their homologues are 400-500 aas long and exhibit 10-13 TMSs. They catalyze Na+/H+ and Li+/H+ antiport. They exhibit activity at basic pH (8-10) with no activity at pH 7.5. The Amylolytica antiporter has low Na+ affinity and has optimal activity at 600 mM Na+. Homologues are found in Pseudomonadota of all groups, Flavobacteriia, and Chlamydia. Distant homologues of the IT superfamily are ubiquitous.

The generalized reaction catalyzed by NhaD is:nH+ (in) + mNa+ (out) ⇌ nH+ (out) + mNa+ (in).

See also 
 Sodium-Proton antiporter
 Antiporter
 Transporter Classification Database

Further reading 
 Barrero-Gil, Javier; Rodríguez-Navarro, Alonso; Benito, Begoña (2007-01-01). "Cloning of the PpNHAD1 transporter of Physcomitrella patens, a chloroplast transporter highly conserved in photosynthetic eukaryotic organisms". Journal of Experimental Botany 58(11): 2839–2849. doi:10.1093/jxb/erm094. ISSN 0022-0957. PMID 17617660.
 Kurz, Matthias; Brünig, Anika N. S.; Galinski, Erwin A. (2006-01-01). "NhaD type sodium/proton-antiporter of Halomonas elongata: a salt stress response mechanism in marine habitats?". Saline Systems 2: 10.doi:10.1186/1746-1448-2-10. ISSN 1746-1448.PMC 1552076. PMID 16872527.
 Liu, Jun; Xue, Yanfen; Wang, Quanhui; Wei, Yi; Swartz, Talia H.; Hicks, David B.; Ito, Masahiro; Ma, Yanhe; Krulwich, Terry A. (2005-11-01). "The activity profile of the NhaD-type Na+(Li+)/H+ antiporter from the soda Lake Haloalkaliphile Alkalimonas amylolytica is adaptive for the extreme environment". Journal of Bacteriology 187 (22): 7589–7595.doi:10.1128/JB.187.22.7589-7595.2005. ISSN 0021-9193.
 Melo, Ana M. P.; Felix, Nuno A. M.; Carita, João N.; Saraiva, Lígia M.; Teixeira, Miguel (2006-09-29)."The Na+/H+ antiporter of the thermohalophilic bacterium Rhodothermus marinus". Biochemical and Biophysical Research Communications 348 (3): 1011–1017.doi:10.1016/j.bbrc.2006.07.134. ISSN 0006-291X.PMID 16904646.
 Zhong, Nai-Qin; Han, Li-Bo; Wu, Xiao-Min; Wang, Li-Li; Wang, Fang; Ma, Yan-He; Xia, Gui-Xian (2012-06-01). "Ectopic expression of a bacterium NhaD-type Na+/H+ antiporter leads to increased tolerance to combined salt/alkali stresses". Journal of Integrative Plant Biology 54 (6): 412–421. doi:10.1111/j.1744-7909.2012.01129.x. ISSN 1744-7909. PMID 22583823.

References 

Protein families
Membrane proteins
Transmembrane proteins
Transmembrane transporters
Transport proteins
Integral membrane proteins